Cut Nyak Dhien Airport (Indonesian: Bandar Udara Cut Nyak Dhien)  is an airport located in Nagan Raya Regency, Aceh, Indonesia. 

The airport is located 26 kilometers from Suka Makmue, 46 kilometers from Meulaboh, West Aceh Regency, and 347 kilometers from the city of Banda Aceh.

The airport serves both Suka Makmue, the capital of the Nagan Raya Regency and Meulaboh, the capital of West Aceh Regency.

Name 
The airport is named after Cut Nyak Dhien (1848–1908), the woman who led the Acehnese guerrilla forces during the Aceh War against the Dutch for 25 years, and was awarded the title of National Hero of Indonesia in 1964.

Airlines and destinations

Statistic

See also
List of airports in Indonesia

References

Airports in Aceh